Jessica Myers (born 4 September 2002) is a footballer who plays as a fullback. Born in Canada, she represents the Guyana women's national team.

International career
Myers represented Guyana at the 2020 CONCACAF Women's U-20 Championship. At senior level, she played the 2018 CFU Women's Challenge Series.

See also
List of Guyana women's international footballers

References

2002 births
Living people
Citizens of Guyana through descent
Guyanese women's footballers
Women's association football fullbacks
Guyana women's international footballers
People from Ajax, Ontario
Soccer people from Ontario
Canadian women's soccer players
Black Canadian women's soccer players
Canadian sportspeople of Guyanese descent